Lago di Gramolazzo is a lake in the Province of Lucca, Tuscany, Italy. At an elevation of 604 m, its surface area is 1 km².

Lakes of Tuscany